Enzo Riccioni was an Italian cinematographer. He worked on more than eighty films in Italy and France during a lengthy career.

Selected filmography
 Lady Harrington (1926)
 Sunday of Life (1931)
 Longing for the Sea (1931)
 The Concert (1931)
 The Devil's Holiday (1931)
 The Leap into the Void (1932)
 The Red Robe (1933)
 Fifty Fathoms Deep  (1932)
 Criminal (1933)
 The Agony of the Eagles (1933)
 Prince Jean (1934)
 Dora Nelson (1935)
 27 Rue de la Paix (1936)
 Latin Quarter (1939)
 The Blue Danube (1940)
 Fortunato (1942)
 Three Boys, One Girl  (1948)
 Mystery in Shanghai (1950)
 Naked in the Wind (1953)
 Vice Squad (1959)
 Interpol Against X (1960)
 Business (1960)
Prostitution (1963)

References

Bibliography
 Phil Powrie & Éric Rebillard. Pierre Batcheff and Stardom in 1920s French Cinema. Edinburgh University Press, 2009.

External links

Year of birth unknown
Year of death unknown
Italian cinematographers